Truth is Beauty, is a  sculpture by Marco Cochrane. The sculpture is lit from the inside by more than 3,000 LED lights. It is part of a series of three large-scale steel sculptures of nude women by Cochrane, Bliss Dance (2010), Truth is Beauty (2013) and R-Evolution (2015). It was first exhibited at the 2013 Burning Man, then the Las Vegas Strip, and is now at permanent display at the San Leandro Tech Campus in California.

References

Burning Man
Outdoor sculptures in California
San Leandro, California